Judy Manning (born July 9, 1978) is a Canadian lawyer in Newfoundland and Labrador. She served as the Minister of Justice and Public Safety, Attorney General and Minister Responsible for the Status of Women in the provincial cabinet from September 30, 2014, to March 12, 2015. Manning was appointed to cabinet by Premier Paul Davis despite not holding a seat in the House of Assembly.

Background
Manning earned a bachelor of commerce (co-op) degree from Memorial University in 2001, and a bachelor of laws degree from Dalhousie University in 2004. She was called to the Newfoundland and Labrador bar in 2005 and to the Ontario bar in 2008.

Manning served as a review commissioner with the Workplace, Health, Safety and Compensation Review Division (WHSCRD) from April to September 2014.

Manning is the niece of Senator and former MHA Fabian Manning. On February 21, 2023, Manning's brother, Eugene Manning, announced his candidacy in the 2023 NL PC leadership election.

Politics
Manning's appointment to cabinet came under fire due to her not being an elected member and because she was unwilling to seek a seat in the House of Assembly in three by-elections. Manning stated she intended to be the Progressive Conservative candidate in the district of Placentia—St. Mary's when that seat became available. The seat at the time was represented by Felix Collins who had previously indicated he would not seek re-election. On March 12, 2015, Manning was removed from cabinet along with two other ministers. Davis cited cost savings as his reason for reducing his cabinet but also noted he was unwilling to have Manning serve in cabinet for up to a year without her holding a seat in the legislature. Davis said he had originally planned on calling a spring election but that was delayed till the fall by his government's decision to remove eight seats from the House of Assembly. It was later reported that when Manning was appointed to cabinet she and Davis were under the impression that Collins would resign his seat in the near future, creating a by-election for her to run in. However, Collins did not resign his seat and he found himself back in cabinet as Attorney General after Manning's departure due to him being the only lawyer within caucus. Manning unsuccessfully contested the 2015 provincial election in that district. She is currently Conservative party National Councillor for Newfoundland and Labrador.

Electoral record

References

Members of the Executive Council of Newfoundland and Labrador
Living people
Candidates in Newfoundland and Labrador provincial elections
Women in Newfoundland and Labrador politics
Women government ministers of Canada
Lawyers in Newfoundland and Labrador
Progressive Conservative Party of Newfoundland and Labrador politicians
1978 births